The Missouri Department of Natural Resources (MoDNR) of the government of the U.S. state of Missouri consists of the Division of Environmental Quality, the Division of Geology and Land Survey, the Division of State Parks, the Environmental and Energy Resources Authority, and the Field Services Division. The Director of MoDNR is Dru Buntin (2021–present).

The Department oversees and operates Missouri state parks and historic sites.

References

External links

Department of Natural Resources fact sheet
Publications by or about the Missouri Department of Natural Resources at Internet Archive.

Natural Resources, Department of
State environmental protection agencies of the United States
Natural resources agencies in the United States
1974 establishments in Missouri